The Heart of the Race: Black Women's Lives in Britain was a 1985 book by Beverley Bryan, Stella Dadzie and Suzanne Scafe. A socio-historical study, it looked at the realities of life for Black women in the United Kingdom after the Second World War. Although credited to Bryan, Dadzie and Scafe, they weren't the only authors of the book which was in fact written not only by those three but also by several other women in the Brixton Black Women's Group (BWG), which all three were members of. The BWG originally planned for the The Heart of the Race to be credited to the "Brixton Black Women's Group" as a whole. The book's publisher Virago Press refused to use a collective name and instead credited three members of the BWG. Namely, Bryan, Dadzie and Scafe. The Heart of the Race was dedicated to Olive Morris, a co-founder of the BWG who died in 1979.

The book discusses the history of Afro-Caribbean immigration to the UK, specifically focusing on the experiences of Black British women. The BWG focused on the role played by Black British women in the postwar economy, including the development of the National Health Service (NHS), in addition to discussing the anti-racist work Black British women were involved in.

The book won the Martin Luther King Memorial Prize in 1985.

The Heart of the Race was later republished in 2018 by Verso Books.

References

1985 books
Black British history
Books about social history
Books about women
Virago Press books
Verso Books books